Glo Worm is a stuffed toy for young children, designed by Hasbro's Playskool division, and made in Pawtucket, Rhode Island. Introduced in 1982, the plush, pajamaed worm body contained a battery-powered device that when squeezed would light up the toy's vinyl head from within, creating a soft glow.

The original toy, upon release, was such a success that Hasbro released a new Musical Glo Worm, a series of story books, night lights, videos and other merchandise that continued until the early 1990s. However, in late 2005, the product was criticized for harming children; its plastic head was softened with phthalates, which can be dangerous if swallowed by children.

Glo Friends
In 1986, Playskool released a number of "Glo"-based toys that glowed but were made of soft vinyl. These toys, collectively known as the Glo Friends, were so successful that American fast food chain Wendy's in 1989 also released a series of 13 soft vinyl toys to advertise their chain. Their names were:
Glo Snugbug,
Glo Snail,
Glo Doodlebug,
Glo Bug,
Glo Grannybug,
Glo Clutterbug,
Glo Bashfulbug,
Glo Butterfly,
Glo Bopbug,
Glo Cricket,
Glo Skunkbug,
Glo Bookbug,
Glo worm, and
Glo Nikkibug.

Additional characters included:
Glo Nuttybug,
Glo Sniffle Snail,
Glo Firefly,
Glo Hopper,
Glo Spider,
Glo Bopbug,
Glo Flutterbug,
Glo Turtle (shell opens to carry Glo Friends) and
Glo Shark.

References

Fictional worms
Hasbro products
1980s toys
Products introduced in 1982
Toy animals
Stuffed toys